Pudupakkam is a village near Chennai, India. It is closer to Siruseri SIPCOT. This village comes under Thiruporur taluk of Chengalpattu district in Tamil Nadu. Nearby hospitals include Chettinad Health City, Global Hospitals and Tagore Medical College Hospital.It has reputed Dr. Ambedkar Government Law College. The opening of an IT park in Siruseri, has led to an increase in apartments and villas in the region.

References

External links 
 Pudupakkam Village on Wikimapia.
business.google.com/b/101994651631539472215

Villages in Chengalpattu district
Suburbs of Chennai